The United Electric Car Company was a tramcar manufacturer from 1905 to 1917 in Preston, Lancashire, England.

History

The Electric Railway and Tramway Carriage Works was formed in 1897 registered on 25 April 1898 to acquire works at Preston, Lancashire. It was founded by two Scots, W. B. Dick and John Kerr.

They formed a new company, English Electrical Manufacturing  based in a new West Works on Strand Road, Preston in 1900, to build the electric motors for their trams.

In 1905 the Electric Railway and Tramway Carriage Works took over two other works, including G.F. Milnes & Co. in Hadley, Shropshire, the name being then changed to United Electric Car Co.

By 1914, the company employed around 2,000 people. They produced electrical equipment for tramways and railways and built over 8,000 tramcars, for service in the UK and abroad, including to the Hong Kong Tramways and Buenos Aires tramways operated by the Anglo-Argentine Tramways Company.

Tram 49 is operated by the Black Country Living Museum.  This double decker tram was originally built in 1909 for Wolverhampton Corporation Tramways. It is a typical Edwardian tramcar with an ornate lower saloon and open upper deck with traverse seating. Originally equipped with the Lorain system taking its power supply from studs in the road, it was later converted to run from overhead wires. Preserved in 1976, the tram was painstakingly restored by the Black Country Museum Transport Group over many years and completed in 2004.

Merger

In 1917 Dick, Kerr & Co., also in Strand Road, Preston, acquired the United Electric Car Co and in 1918 the Company became a part of English Electric.

See also
UEC Preston - used on Line A of the Buenos Aires Underground

Archives and records
United Electric Car Company photographs at Baker Library Special Collections, Harvard Business School.

References

Rolling stock manufacturers of the United Kingdom
Electrical engineering companies of the United Kingdom
Vehicle manufacturing companies established in 1897
Vehicle manufacturing companies disestablished in 1917
History of Preston
Tram manufacturers
1897 establishments in England
1917 disestablishments in England
Electric vehicle manufacturers of the United Kingdom
British companies disestablished in 1917
British companies established in 1897